Waltz With Me (released September 9, 2008 on the Heilo catalog by the Grappa label - HCD 7216) is a live album by Annbjørg Lien.

Review 
Telemarkfestivalen 2007 presented the world artist and folk musician Annbjørg Lien as this year's festival composer. Here Lien performed together with an international folk music string quartet comprising Annbjørg Lien (hardingfele and fiddle), Bruce Molsky (fiddle & vocals), Christine Hanson (cello) and Mikael Marin (viola), a completely originally written commission, Waltz With Me, based on a folk musical expression, rooted in Northern Europe and North America. The free events reflects crossover and playfulness.

Reception
The Allmusic reviewer Chris Nickson awarded the album 4 stars, and the review by Anders Grønneberg of the Norwegian newspaper Dagbladet awarded the album dice 4.

Track listing 
«The Traveller» (5:33)
«Sula Mountain» (4:52)
«The Fiddle» (4:09)
«Home East» (6:16)
«Masques» (4:53)
«Waltz With Me» (2:46)
«Walking Strings» (4:56)
«Dancing The Years All Away» (4:28)
«The Old Car» (3:46)
«Mother And A Son» (5:02)

Personnel 
Annbjørg Lien – Hardingfele & fiddle
Bruce Molsky – fiddle, vocals, Haringfele & guitar
Mikael Marin – viola
Christine Hanson – cello
Kirsten Braten Berg – vocals & zither

Credits 
Arrangers – Annbjørg Lien, Bruce Molsky, Christine Hanson & Mikael Marin
Morten Lund - mastering
Recording & mixing – Trond Engebretsen
Composer & producer – Annbjørg Lien
Designer - Rune Mortensen

Notes 
Recorded and mixed at Kongshavn Studios in Kristiansand, Norway 2007

References 

Annbjørg Lien albums
2008 live albums